Balticon is the Maryland Regional science fiction convention, sponsored by the Baltimore Science Fiction Society (BSFS). It has been held annually since 1966. The name "Balticon" is trademarked by BSFS.

Overview
Balticon brings together over 1800 science, science fiction and fantasy professionals, creative amateurs, and fans on Memorial Day weekend each year for a 4-day multi-track event in or around Baltimore.

Balticon can be described as a "General" or "Big Tent" science fiction convention since, while the primary emphasis is literary, programming and activities cover a number of other areas, such as anime, art, costuming, science, Podcasting and new media, gaming, and Filk music.

Balticon is produced by the Baltimore Science Fiction Society, Inc., a 501(c)(3) literary society. It is run entirely by volunteers, who assume responsibility at many levels, ranging from gofers who sign up and run errands at the convention, to the Con Chair who may spend up to two years on planning and administration.

Activities and program items are developed by the convention staff with suggestions from program participants, and the literary program usually concentrates most heavily on the segment of genre in which the year's Guest of Honor publishes most of his/her work.

Some Balticon activities and tracks run 24 hours a day from Friday afternoon to Monday afternoon. Balticon also usually hosts a Robert Heinlein "Pay It Forward" Blood Drive at some time during the convention.

Awards

BSFS presents the Compton Crook Award given for the best first novel in the Science Fiction, Fantasy or Horror genre, during Balticon. The previous year's winner is invited back to present the award to the new winner.

The winner of the annual Jack L. Chalker Young Writer's Contest is announced at Balticon. BSFS sponsors this short story writing contest for Maryland residents or school attendees between the ages of 14 and 18, in the Fantasy or Science Fiction genres.

Beginning in 2013, the Baltimore Science Fiction Society began presenting the Robert A. Heinlein Award at Balticon Opening Ceremonies. BSFS is the sponsoring organization for the award, which was started in 2003 by Yoji Kondo, and is 50% funded by The Heinlein Society. The recipient is selected by a panel of judges originally chosen from among Robert Heinlein's fellow SF writers.

The Balticon Poetry Contest winners are invited to read their winning entries at Balticon, and they are published in the Balticon Convention Program Guide. Cash prizes and convention memberships are awarded.

The Masquerade is usually held on Saturday night, and awards are given for various categories in Costuming, including creativity, construction and presentation.

The Balticon Sunday Night Short Film Festival (BSNSFF) is a no-submission-fee competition traditionally held on Sunday night for short films in the Science Fact, Science Fiction, Fantasy, and Horror genres. Currently, the audience votes to choose winners in animated and live-action categories.

Past Balticon Sunday Night Short Film Festival winners:
2006 THE GRANDFATHER PARADOX
2007 HIDE AND SEEK – Chris Romano, Creator/Director
2008 THE END IS NIGHT
 2009 Best Animated BURNING SAFARI
2009 Best Live Action The Hunt for Gollum
 2010 Best Animated ETA – Henrik Bjerregaard Clausen, director
 2010 Best Live Action (tie) ANDROID LOVE – Lee Citron, writer/director
 2010 Best Live Action (tie) THE LEGACY – Mike Doto, writer/director
 2010 Best Specialty Short THIS TOO SHALL PASS (OK Go)
 2010 Director's Choice Animated THE PAINTER OF SKIES – Jorge Morais Valle, writer/director
 2010 Director's Choice Live Action MY FRIEND JOSH – Shaun Springer, director
 2011 Best Animated ZERO – Christopher Kezelos, director
 2011 Best Live Action DEAD ON TIME – Kostos Skiftas, Andreas Lambropoulos, directors
 2011 Director's Choice Animated SINTEL – Colin Levy, writer/director
 2011 Director's Choice Live Action CORBIN – Brent Weichsel, director

Balticon may also premier an independent feature-length film, and a locally (MD, DC, VA, PA) produced feature film some time during the 4-day convention, as well as several hours of panel discussions in Balticon's Filmmaking Program track.

History
Prior to 1966, BSFS held an annual event for the election of BSFS board of directors. After several years, BSFS rented hotel space and invited an author to speak, as a guest of honor, at its election events. From this point forward, the event became an annual convention known as Balticon. Subsequently, BSFS election functions were moved to a different date.

Before 2001, Balticon was held on Easter weekend to take advantage of lower hotel costs and was three days long; however, in 2001 Balticon moved to Memorial Day Weekend and expanded to a full four days.

Past conventions

Virtual convention

Balticon 54 had been scheduled as an in person for 22–25 May 2020, but the in-person convention was cancelled due to the COVID-19 pandemic. The event was reorganized to be a free online convention on the same dates. It took place over Zoom, Discord, and Second Life. Balticon 55, May 28 - 
31, 2021, was also held as a virtual event. Admission to the virtual conventions was free in both years. A hybrid event is planned for Balticon 56. This will be the first time a charge is required to attend virtual programming.

References

External links
 Balticon official website
 Baltimore Science Fiction Society official website
 BSFS Website Film Festival
 Photos from Balticons past

Science fiction conventions in the United States
Festivals in Baltimore
Recurring events established in 1966
1966 establishments in Maryland
Conventions in Maryland
Conventions in Baltimore